Guendoline Rome Viray Gomez (born August 30, 1997), better known by his stage name No Rome, is a London-based Filipino musician. Gomez grew up in Manila before settling in London. He is currently signed to Dirty Hit, the same label as collaborators The 1975. His debut studio album, It's All Smiles, was released in December 2021.

Discography

Studio albums 
 It's All Smiles (3 December 2021)

Extended plays 
 Fantasy (2013)
 Hurry Home & Rest (15 July 2015)
 RIP Indo Hisashi (29 August 2018)
 Crying in the Prettiest Places (3 May 2019)

Singles 
 "Dance with Me" (2013)
 "Blue Jeans" (2017)
 "Do It Again" (2018)
 "Seventeen" (2018)
 "Saint Laurent" (2018)
 "Narcissist"  (2018)
 "Cashmoney" (2019)
 "Pink" (2019)
 "Talk Nice" (2019)
 “Trust3000”  (2019)
 "Hurry Home"  (2020)
 "1:45AM"  (2020)
 "Spinning"  (2021)
 "When She Comes Around" (2021)
 "I Want U" (2021)

References 

1997 births
Living people
Musicians from Metro Manila
Filipino expatriates in the United Kingdom
Synth-pop musicians
Chillwave musicians
Chill-out musicians
Dirty Hit artists
Musicians from London